Vasili Kuznetsov may refer to:
 Vasili Kuznetsov (politician) (1901–1990), Soviet politician
 Vasili Kuznetsov (decathlete) (1932–2001), Soviet decathlete
 Vasili Kuznetsov (footballer) (born 1978), Russian footballer
 Vasily Kuznetsov (general) (1894–1964), Soviet general in World War II
 Vasily Kuznetsov (badminton) (born 1989), Russian badminton player